Ganoderma microsporum is a species of Ganoderma mushroom native to Taiwan that grows on willow trees. The specific epithet microsporum refers to the small size of its spores, measuring 6–8.5 by 4.5–5 μm, which is smaller than the spores of all other known types of Ganoderma.

Appearance 
Ganoderma microsporum has a relatively short or obscure stem that appears bronze or dark purple. The cap is shelf like or unevenly shaped and has a glazed appearance.

Discovery 
Ganoderma microsporum was first discovered in Taipei, Taiwan by R.-S. Hseu in 1982, and published in the scientific journal Mycotaxon in 1989.

Research 
Compounds discovered in Ganoderma include polysaccharides, triterpenoids, nucleic acids and fungal immunomodulatory proteins or FIPs.
According to the NIH PubMed database on the physiological activities of G. microsporum, primarily from the FIP found in G. microsporum (FIP-gmi or GMI), currently known physiological activities include effects on the central nervous system and the respiratory system.

References 

Ganodermataceae
Fungi of Taiwan
Fungi described in 1989